TV Climatempo is a Brazilian TV channel specialising in weather forecasts. Forecasts are shown for more than 100 cities there is a five-day forecast for the capital. At the bottom of the screen, there is up-to-date information on what is happening in other cities, such as the relative humidity.

References

Television networks in Brazil